Vijay Bhushan (born 23 September 1939) is an Indian former cricketer. He played first-class cricket for Delhi and Services between 1960 and 1974.

See also
 List of Delhi cricketers

References

External links
 

1939 births
Living people
Indian cricketers
Delhi cricketers
Services cricketers
Cricketers from Delhi